Troy Fletcher (born 1 September 1973) is an Australian former professional rugby league footballer who played in the late 1990s and early 2000s. He played for the Newcastle Knights, with whom he won the 1997 ARL Premiership.

Background
Fletcher was born in Waratah, New South Wales.

Playing career
Fletcher played his whole professional career at the Knights. He also played in their very first grand final squad in 1997.

References

1973 births
Living people
Australian rugby league players
Newcastle Knights players
Rugby league players from Newcastle, New South Wales
Western Suburbs Rosellas players